The Precinct Reporter is a weekly African-American newspaper published in San Bernardino, California. It was founded in 1965 by Art Townsend. As of 1989, it had a circulation of 55,000.

References

External links
Official website

African-American newspapers
Weekly newspapers published in California